Blade Neville Thomson (born 4 December 1990) is a former professional rugby union player who played as a lock or loose forward. Born in Auckland, New Zealand, he represented Scotland in international rugby, being eligible for the national team through his paternal grandfather, Robert, who was from Wishaw.

Professional career

Thomson was a member of the Hurricanes Wider Training Group in 2012, and he joined the squad for the 2013 Super Rugby season. Thomson missed the 2017 Super Rugby season due to shoulder reconstruction surgery.

Thomson joined Pro14 team the Scarlets at the beginning of the 2018–19 season.

On 16 February 2023, Thomson announced his retirement due to a head injury.

International career

Thomson was a member of the New Zealand Under 20 team that won the 2010 IRB Junior World Championship in Argentina, where the 197 cm forward played alongside the likes of Crusaders Tyler Bleyendaal and Tom Marshall and All Black winger Julian Savea.

In October 2018, Thomson was called up to Scotland for the Autumn Internationals. He made his Scotland debut on 24 August 2019 in a Rugby World Cup warm-up match against France at Murrayfield Stadium.

References

External links 

Living people
1990 births
New Zealand rugby union players
New Zealand people of Scottish descent
Rugby union flankers
Hurricanes (rugby union) players
Taranaki rugby union players
Māori All Blacks players
Rugby union players from Auckland
People educated at Gisborne Boys' High School
Scotland international rugby union players
Scarlets players